Her Majesty's Yacht Britannia, also known as the Royal Yacht Britannia, is the former royal yacht of the British monarchy. She was in service from 1954 until 1997. She was the 83rd such vessel since King Charles II acceded to the throne in 1660, and is the second royal yacht to bear the name, the first being the racing cutter built for the Prince of Wales in 1893. During her 43-year career, the yacht travelled more than a million nautical miles around the world to more than 600 ports in 135 countries. Now retired from royal service, Britannia is permanently berthed at Ocean Terminal, Leith in Edinburgh, Scotland, where it is a visitor attraction with over 300,000 visits each year.

Construction
HMY Britannia was built at the shipyard of John Brown & Co. Ltd in Clydebank, Dunbartonshire. She was launched by Queen Elizabeth II on 16 April 1953, and commissioned on 11 January 1954. The ship was designed with three masts: a  foremast, a  mainmast, and a  mizzenmast. The top aerial on the foremast and the top  of the mainmast were hinged to allow the ship to pass under bridges.

Britannia was designed to be converted into a hospital ship in time of war, although this capability was never used. In the event of nuclear war, it was intended for the Queen and Prince Philip, Duke of Edinburgh, to take refuge aboard Britannia off the north-west coast of Scotland.

Crew

Royal Navy officers were appointed for up to two years.  The crew were volunteers from the general service of the Royal Navy. After 365 days' service, they could be admitted to the Permanent Royal Yacht Service as Royal Yachtsmen and serve until they chose to leave the service or were dismissed for medical or disciplinary reasons. As a result, some served for 20 years or more. The crew also included a detachment of Royal Marines. A contingent of Royal Marines Band members embarked whenever Britannia was on duty away from home port.

History
Britannia sailed on her maiden voyage from Portsmouth to Grand Harbour, Malta, departing on 14 April and arriving on 22 April 1954. She carried Prince Charles and Princess Anne to Malta in order for them to meet the Queen and the Duke of Edinburgh at the end of the royal couple's Commonwealth tour. The Queen and the Duke of Edinburgh embarked on Britannia for the first time in Tobruk on 1 May 1954.

On 20 July 1959, Britannia sailed the newly opened Saint Lawrence Seaway en route to Chicago, where she docked, making the Queen the first British monarch to visit the city. U.S. president Dwight D. Eisenhower was aboard Britannia for part of this cruise; Presidents Gerald Ford, Ronald Reagan, and Bill Clinton were welcomed aboard in later years. Anne and Mark Phillips took their honeymoon cruise aboard the ship in 1973; Charles would do the same with Diana in 1981. The ship evacuated over 1,000 refugees from the civil war in Aden in 1986. The vessel sailed to Canada in 1991 and made a port of call in Toronto and Kingston, Ontario.

HMY Britannia, when on royal duties, was escorted by a Royal Navy warship. The yacht was a regular sight at Cowes Week in early August and, usually, for the remainder of the month, was home to the Queen and her family for an annual cruise around the islands off the west coast of Scotland (known as the "Western Isles Tour").

During her career as Royal Yacht, Britannia conveyed the Queen, other members of the Royal Family and various dignitaries on 696 foreign visits and 272 visits in British waters. In this time, Britannia steamed .

Decommissioning

In 1994, the Conservative government announced the yacht's retirement:

In January 1997, the government committed itself to replacing the Royal Yacht if reelected. The timing of the announcement, close to a general election, was controversial; The Guardian Weekly called it "part of a populist appeal to wavering Tory voters in the run-up to the general election" and reported that the Queen was "furious" that the Royal Family was "dragged into the centre of the election campaign, just as it is fighting to restore its public image." Sir Edward Heath publicly objected to the government's handling of the issue, stating "The Conservative Party above all must be an honourable party. And I don't believe the actions that have been taken are honourable ones and should never have been taken in this way."

The government argued that the cost was justified by its role in foreign policy and promoting British interests abroad, particularly through conferences held by British Invisibles, formerly the Committee on Invisible Exports. It was estimated by the Overseas Trade Board that events held on board the yacht helped raise £3 billion for HM Treasury between 1991 and 1995 alone.

The Labour opposition announced it would not commit the use of public funds for a replacement vessel for at least the first two years of any new Labour government. After its election victory in May 1997, the new government considered multiple options for the future of a royal yacht, but concluded in October of that year that Britannia would not be replaced:

The Royal Yacht's final foreign mission was to convey the last Governor of Hong Kong, Chris Patten, and the Prince of Wales back from Hong Kong after its handover to the People's Republic of China on 1 July 1997. Britannia was decommissioned on 11 December 1997. The Queen, normally undemonstrative in public, was reported to have shed a tear at the decommissioning ceremony that was attended by most of the senior members of the Royal Family.

Visitor attraction
Listed as part of the National Historic Fleet, Britannia is a visitor attraction moored in the historic Port of Leith in Edinburgh, Scotland, and is cared for by the Royal Yacht Britannia Trust, a registered charity. There was some controversy over the siting of the ship, with some arguing that she would be better moored on the River Clyde, where she was built, than in Edinburgh, with which the yacht had few links. Her positioning in Leith coincided with a redevelopment of the harbour area and the advent of Scottish devolution.

Entrance to the yacht is via the Ocean Terminal development, and over 300,000 people visit the Royal Yacht Britannia every year. She is one of the UK's top evening events venues. On 18 May 2006, the Swiss-born Hollywood actress and first Bond girl, Ursula Andress, celebrated her 70th birthday on board.  On 29 July 2011, a drinks reception was held on board Britannia for Queen Elizabeth's granddaughter Zara Phillips and her then fiancé, Mike Tindall, to celebrate their forthcoming wedding.

An early Land Rover in much-restored shape is displayed in the on-board garage and a retired Rolls-Royce Phantom V state car is parked on the wharf below the ship. The tour of the five decks open to the public includes the Queen's bedroom, which can be viewed behind a glass wall, and the state dining and drawing rooms, which hosted grand receptions for kings and queens, presidents and prime ministers throughout the world. The clocks on board are stopped at 3:01, the time that the Queen last disembarked. The royal deck tea room was added in 2009.

The 1936 racing yacht , once owned by the Queen and Prince Philip, is now berthed alongside Britannia. Bloodhound was one of the most successful ocean-racing yachts ever built and was the yacht on which King Charles III and the Princess Royal learned to sail. The Royal Yacht Britannia Trust bought Bloodhound in early 2010 and she is the centrepiece of an exhibition focusing on the Royal Family's passion for sailing. Visitors can view Bloodhound from a specially built pontoon when the racing yacht is in port. During July and August, she is berthed in Oban marina and is available for private charter, as she sails around the islands once visited by the Royal Family during their annual fortnight holiday in the Western Isles of Scotland. During this period, Royal Yachtsmen (Yotties) from Britannia'''s original crew sail the yacht for the Britannia Trust.

Proposals for successor
Proposals for the construction of a new royal yacht, perhaps financed through a loan or by the royal family's own funds, have made little headway. In December 2019 it was reported that the late Sir Donald Gosling donated £50 million in his will to pay for it.

In May 2021, it was reported that Prime Minister Boris Johnson would announce the construction of a new royal yacht, named after Prince Philip, Duke of Edinburgh, "within weeks". On 29 May, Johnson announced that the "new national flagship" – a ship rather than a luxury yacht – would enter service within the next four years and cost up to £200 million. The following day it was reported that government plans to name the ship after the Duke of Edinburgh were not well-received amongst royal sources, and these plans had subsequently been "abandoned". By 2022 plans had progressed to two favoured design teams. It was reported in October 2022 that Chancellor Jeremy Hunt was planning to scrap plans for a new yacht as part of a package of spending cuts.

Commanding officers
Captain J. S. Dalglish, 7 January – 28 April 1954
Vice Admiral Sir Conolly Abel Smith, 28 April 1954 – 30 January 1958
Vice Admiral Sir Peter Dawnay, 30 January 1958 – 25 January 1962
Rear Admiral Sir Joseph Henley, 25 January 1962 – 9 March 1965
Rear Admiral Sir Patrick Morgan, 9 March 1965 – 1 September 1970
Rear Admiral Sir Richard Trowbridge, 1 September 1970 – 11 September 1975
Rear Admiral Sir Hugh Janion, 11 September 1975 – 4 February 1981
Rear Admiral Sir Paul Greening, 4 February 1981 – 12 September 1985
Rear Admiral Sir John Garnier, 12 September 1985 – 18 September 1990
Rear Admiral Sir Robert Woodard, 18 September 1990 – 1 April 1995
Commodore A. J. C. Morrow, 1 April 1995 – 11 December 1997

See also
 K1 Britannia, a planned replica of King George V's racing yacht Britannia to be used for charitable purposes.
 Hebridean Princess, twice chartered by the Queen since the retirement of HMY Britannia. Gloriana, a Royal barge in operation since 2012
List of royal yachts of the United Kingdom
The Royal Train
Bentley State Limousine
Air transport of the Royal Family
Operation Candid, a Cold War era contingency plan involving HMY Britannia''.

References

Sources
 Shepeard, Victor (1954). "Her Majesty's Yacht Britannia"
 HMY Britannia (Caledonian Maritime Research Trust Database)

External links

 Official website of the Royal Yacht Britannia
 Newsreel of the Queen launching Britannia (1953)
 HMY Britannia entering Portsmouth videos

Royal Yachts of the United Kingdom
Passenger ships of the United Kingdom
Hospital ships of the Royal Navy
Museum ships in the United Kingdom
Ships of Scotland
Ships built on the River Clyde
1997 in Hong Kong
1953 ships
Museums in Edinburgh
Tourist attractions in Edinburgh
Ships and vessels of the National Historic Fleet
1953 in Scotland
Leith
Scottish ceremonial units